Mario Franco Valencia (born 20 January 1969) is a Mexican politician from the National Action Party. In 2009 he served as Deputy of the LX Legislature of the Mexican Congress representing the State of Mexico.

References

1969 births
Living people
Politicians from the State of Mexico
National Action Party (Mexico) politicians
21st-century Mexican politicians
Deputies of the LX Legislature of Mexico
Members of the Chamber of Deputies (Mexico) for the State of Mexico